Dicycla is a genus of moths of the family Noctuidae.

Species
 Dicycla oo (Linnaeus, 1758)

References
Natural History Museum Lepidoptera genus database
Dicycla at funet

Hadeninae